Pat Horan is an Irish hurling referee. A native of County Offaly he was one of the sport's top referees throughout the 1990s. Horan officiated at several All-Ireland finals in minor, under-21 and senior levels. 

His choice to officiate the 2004 All-Ireland Senior Hurling Championship quarter-final replay between Clare and Kilkenny was controversial.

Horan has also given his opinions during hurling controversies.

References

 Donegan, Des, The Complete Handbook of Gaelic Games (DBA Publications Limited, 2005).

Year of birth missing (living people)
Living people
Hurling referees